Oxymeris strigata, common name : the zebra auger, is a species of sea snail, a marine gastropod mollusc in the family Terebridae, the auger snails.

Description
The shell size varies between 60 mm and 164 mm.

Distribution
This species is distributed in the Gulf of California, along Mexico, and in the Pacific Ocean along Peru and the Galapagos Islands.

References

 Bratcher T. & Cernohorsky W.O. (1987). Living terebras of the world. A monograph of the recent Terebridae of the world. American Malacologists, Melbourne, Florida & Burlington, Massachusetts. 240pp
Terryn Y. (2007). Terebridae: A Collectors Guide. Conchbooks & NaturalArt. 59pp + plates.

External links
 

Terebridae
Gastropods described in 1825
Taxa named by George Brettingham Sowerby I